Mattaincourt is a commune in the Vosges department in Grand Est in northeastern France.

Inhabitants are called Mattaincurtiens.

Geography
Mattaincourt lies on the southern part of the Lorraine Plateau, in a wooded area of gentle hills known as the Vôge. The river Madon flows through the commune on its way north to join the Moselle near Nancy.

History

Etymology
The name Mattaincourt is a latinate one which comes from Martin Court, or the domain (Latin "curtis") of Martin.   The Martin in question must have been part of the local Gallo-Roman establishment:  the neighbouring village of Hymont is believed to have belonged to a Frank named Hindonis.   The course of the Roman road connecting Langres with Metz runs through the commune a short distance to the west and north of the village where part of it doubles as the modern departmental road connecting Mattaincourt with the village of Mirecourt, beyond Hymont to the north.

Manufacturing
The waters of the Madon were formerly used for linen fulling (producing).  Raw materials were purchased at the markets of Frankfurt or Strasbourg, and the linen cloth produced was sold not just in Savoy, but also in Burgundy, Switzerland and even in Flanders.  The drapers of Mattaincourt, Mirecourt and Poussay formed themselves into a single grouping which became a commercially powerful corporation:  the weavers' mark appeared on each item of cloth.   The figure "4" which can still be seen on some of the doorways in the village is said to be the drapers' mark.

Personalities
Pierre Fourier (30 November 1565 - 9 December 1640), a leading apostle of the counter-reformation, was the parish priest responsible for Mattaincourt for two decades from 1597 (some source state 1595).

See also
Communes of the Vosges department

References

Communes of Vosges (department)